Uba Sani (born 31 December 1970) is a Nigerian engineer and politician who is the governor-elect of Kaduna State. He has served as senator for Kaduna Central since 2019. He was elected on 23 February 2019, under the platform of the All Progressive Congress. He defeated the incumbent senator Shehu Sani of the PRP.

Early life

Uba Sani was born on 31 December 1970 in Zaria local government area of Kaduna State. A Mechanical Engineer by training, he holds a Master of Science degree in Finance from the University of Calabar and a Post-Graduate Diploma in Business Administration from the University of Abuja.

Uba Sani protested against military authoritarianism in Nigeria, leaving behind a footprint of bravery and patriotism. He deployed his organization and networking skills in creating a strategic base for the pro-democracy movement in Northern Nigeria. He also made ample use of his civil society organization, the Movement for Freedom and Justice to champion the rights of the underprivileged and offered them unfettered access to justice. He has held successfully the roles of the National Vice Chairman (North) of Campaign for Democracy (CD) and Deputy National Chairman (North) of the Joint Action Committee (JACON) led by the legendary Chief Gani Fawehinmi, SAN.

Politics
Sani went into politics after the return of Democracy in Nigeria in 1999, and supported the People's Democratic Party presidential candidate, Chief Olusegun Obasanjo. After winning the presidential election, Sani was appointed Special advisor on public affairs to the president. He also worked at the Federal Capital Territory Administration (FCTA) on some advisory roles to the then FCT Minister, Nasir Ahmad El-Rufai and the Kaduna State Ministry of Housing and Works. In 2011, Sani contested in the People's Democratic Party primaries for the Kaduna Central Senatorial seat but he lost the primaries, and in 2015, he was appointed by the Kaduna state governor Malam Nasir Ahmad el-Rufai as the Special Adviser, Political and intergovernmental affairs. However, in 2019, Sani showed interest and contested the second time for the Kaduna Central senatorial seat under the ruling political party, All Progressives Congress, APC and was elected senator during the February 2019 Nigeria general elections. In 2022, Uba Sani picked APC nomination forms for 2023 governorship election in Kaduna State.

Humanitarian Life

Uba Sani founded the Uba Sani Foundation in 2018. The foundation's mission is to promote increased access to good healthcare services, education and improved livelihood for the underprivileged in Nigeria. The foundation uses available resources and expertise to provide assistance to the less privileged in Education, Healthcare, Vocational Skills and Empowerment.

Senator Uba Sani's representation in the senate is also largely seen as a continuation of his love for service to humanity, as a human rights and prodemocracy activist, businessman and philanthropist. His devotion to helping people has endeared him to a lot of people in Kaduna State and indeed several Nigerians across the country.

Bills sponsored

Uba Sani as a Senator representing the people of Kaduna Central Senatorial District have sponsored bills on the floor of the Senate of Nigeria, amongst them are the Banks and other Financial Institutions (Repeal & Re-enactment) Bill, 2020 and the Asset Management Corporation of Nigeria Act (Amendment) Bill 2021 which have both become Acts after being assented to by President Muhammadu Buhari in November 2020 and November 2021 respectively. Other bills sponsored by the Senator are at different levels of legislative progression such as Committee level, some have been passed by the Senate and also awaiting concurrence by the House of Representatives. See full list below;

1. Federal College of Education, Giwa Kaduna State (Est, Etc) Bill 2019 (SB. 121)

2. Federal Medical Centre Rigassa, Kaduna State (Est., Etc.) Bill 2019 (SB.169)

3. Banks and Other Financial Institutions (Repeal and Re-Enactment) Act 2020

4. Care and Protection of Child Parents Bill 2019 (SB198)

5. Federal College of Forestry, Technology and Research, Birnin Gwari, Kaduna State (Est, Etc) Bill 2019 (SB201)
6. University of Technology Kaduna (Est, Etc) Bill 2019

7. Institute of Information and Communication Technology Kaduna South (Est., Etc.) Bill 2020 (SB.407)

8. Constitution of the Federal Republic of Nigeria 1999 (Alteration) Bill 2020 (SB. 410)

9. Foreign Exchange (Control & Monitoring) Act 2004 (Repeal and Re-Enactment) Bill 2020
(SB. 525)

10. FireArms Act Cap F28 FN (Amendment) Bill 2020 (SB. 549)

11. Constitution of the Federal Republic of Nigeria 1999 (Alteration) Bill 2020 (SB.550)

12. National Human Rights Commission Act (Amendment) Bill 2020 (SB. 551)

13. NDLEA Act CAP NO.3 LFN 2004 (Amendment) Bill 2020 (SB. 582)

14. Police Service Commission Act 2001 (Repeal and Re-Enactment) Bill, 2020 (SB. 594)

15. Nigerian Police Act (Amendment) Bill, 2020 (SB. 593)

16. State Police Service Commission (Establishment) Bill, 2020 (SB. 595)

17. Asset Management Corporation of Nigeria Act (Amendment) Act 2021 (SB. 669)

18. Factoring, Assignment and Receivables Financing Bill, 2021 (667)

19. Motor Vehicle (Third Party Insurance) Act Cap M23 Cap M23 LFN 2004 (Amendment) Bill, 2021 (SB. 700)

20. Recovery of Public Property (Special Provisions) Act Cap R4 LFN 2004 (Repeal) Bill (SB. 764)

21. Agricultural and Rural Management Training Institute, Chikun (Establishment) Bill, 2021 (SB. 812)

2023 elections 
Sani emerged the All Progressives Congress governorship candidate in Kaduna State for 2023 elections. He defeated Sani Sha'aban and Bashir Abubakar to emerge winner at the primaries. Uba Sani is believed to be El-Rufai's anointed candidate.

Kaduna Guber elections 

Senator Uba Sani won the All Progressives Congress (APC) ticket to represent the party at the forthcoming 2023 elections.

Senator Uba Sani still occupies the Senatorial Seat representing Kaduna Central at the upper chamber of Nigeria’s National Assembly.

References

External links
 Uba Sani organization

1970 births
Living people
All Progressives Congress politicians
Kaduna Polytechnic alumni
Members of the Senate (Nigeria)
People from Kaduna State